Crowdy Bay is a national park in New South Wales, Australia, 271 km northeast of Sydney.

It is a great seaside retreat, close to Port Macquarie, offering hiking trails, coastal picnics, fishing, and great opportunities to observe wildlife.

The biodiversity in the park is very rich. Here you can see many types of plants and animals. These are White-bellied sea eagles (Haliaeetus leucogaster), Brown striped frog (Limnodynastes peronii), Lace monitor (Varanus varius), Black sheoak (Allocasuarina littoralis), Grass tree (Xanthorrhoea spp.), and others.

See also
 Protected areas of New South Wales

References 

National parks of New South Wales
Protected areas established in 1972
Bays of New South Wales
1972 establishments in Australia